Alvand Rural District is a rural district (dehestan) in the Central District of Qasr-e Shirin County, Kermanshah Province, Iran. At the 2006 census, its population was 16, in 8 families. The rural district has 2 villages.

References 

Rural Districts of Kermanshah Province
Qasr-e Shirin County